Laryngology is a branch of medicine that deals with disorders, diseases and injuries of the larynx, colloquially known as the voice box. Laryngologists treat disorders of the larynx, including diseases that affects the voice, swallowing, or upper airway. Common conditions addressed by laryngologists include vocal fold nodules and cysts, laryngeal cancer, spasmodic dysphonia, laryngopharyngeal reflux, papillomas, and voice misuse/abuse/overuse syndromes. Dysphonia/hoarseness; laryngitis (including Reinke's edema, Vocal cord nodules and polyps); *Spasmodic dysphonia; dysphagia; Tracheostomy; Cancer of the larynx; and vocology (the science and practice of voice habilitation) are included in laryngology.

Etymology of "laryngology"
The word "laryngology" is derived from:
 the Greek prefix λαρυγγ- (laryng-, root = λάρυγξ, meaning "larynx"), and
 the Greek suffix -λογία (-logy, root = λόγος, meaning "the study of", or "knowledge").

Famous laryngologists
 Paul Gerber (1863–1919), who published poetry under the pseudonym Heinrich Garibert
 George Duncan Gibb (1821–1876)
 Morell Mackenzie (1837–1892)
 Felix Semon (1849–1921)
 St Clair Thomson (1857–1943)
 Chevalier Jackson (1865–1958)
 Victor Negus (1887–1974)
 Georges Portmann (1890–1985)
 Sir John Milsom Rees (1866–1952)
 Oliver St John Gogarty

See also
 Otolaryngology

References

External links
 Educational site about disorders of the larynx
 List of Laryngologists in the US and Around the World
 Laryngology 2012
 Medical site dedicated to the study of voice
 Voice doctor directory

 
Otorhinolaryngology
Human voice
Human throat